The Chinese Elm cultivar Ulmus parvifolia 'Prairie Shade' is an American clone selected in 1973 in Oklahoma.

Description
The tree is distinguished by its strong, upright growth when young.

Pests and diseases
The species and its cultivars are highly resistant, but not immune, to Dutch elm disease, and unaffected by the Elm Leaf Beetle Xanthogaleruca luteola.

Cultivation
'Prairie Shade' is not known to be in cultivation beyond North America.

Accessions
None known.

References

Chinese elm cultivar
Ulmus articles missing images
Ulmus